The Jesuit Church, also known as Church of the Gracious Mother of God (Kościół Matki Bożej Łaskawej), is an ornate church within the Old Town precinct in Warsaw, Poland.

History
The Jesuit Church was founded by King Sigismund III Vasa and Podkomorzy Andrzej Bobola (the Old) at Piotr Skarga's initiative, in 1609, for the Jesuits. The main building was constructed between 1609 and 1626 in the Polish Mannerist style by Jan Frankiewicz.

In 1627 the church was encompassed with three chapels, and in 1635 Urszula Meyerin, a great supporter of the Society of Jesus, was buried within. Meyerin funded a silver tabernacle for the church. She was also King Sigismund III's mistress, and was politically influential. Her grave was plundered and destroyed by the Swedes and Brandenburg Germans, in the 1650s, during the Deluge.

A vestibule was added to the interior of the temple in 1633, and a choir was added three years later. An altar made of silver was installed by Cardinal Charles Ferdinand Vasa in the 1640s. The interior of the church was damaged and looted in 1656.

An icon of Our Lady of Graces (Matka Boża Łaskawa), a gift from the Pope Innocent X, was introduced to the church and crowned in 1651. Its veneration has been growing, especially since the epidemic in 1664, when Blessed Virgin Mary was believed to save the city.

In later years the building became more and more ornate, with baroque furnishings and marble altars and floors. Two more chapels were added. When the order of Jesuits was dissolved in 1773, the church changed ownership several times. For some time it was a school church, later it was demoted to the role of the magazine of church furnishings, and then it was given to the order of Piarists. The Jesuits did not get the church back until the end of the First World War. In the 1920s and 1930s the church was renovated.

During World War II, after the Germans suppressed the Warsaw Uprising, they razed the Jesuit Church to the ground.
 All that remained of the four-hundred-year-old edifice was a great pile of rubble. Between the 1950s and 1973, the church was rebuilt in a simplified architectural style.

Interior

The facade is Mannerist, although the interior is completely modern, because very few of the original furnishings of the church were preserved. Inside, there are preserved fragments of a tomb monument of Jan Tarło carved by Jan Jerzy Plersch in white and black marble in 1753, together with reconstructed epitaphs of Sarbiewski, Konarski, Kopczyński and Kiliński. A painting of Our Lady of Grace brought to Poland in 1651 by bishop Juan de Torres as a gift from Pope Innocent X is also displayed, along with a preserved wooden crucifix from 1383, a baroque sculpture of Our Lady of Grace, from the beginning of the 18th century, and a stone sculpture of a laying bear from the half of 18th century.

Burials
 Karol Ferdynand Vasa
 Maciej Kazimierz Sarbiewski (1595–1640), Europe's most prominent Latin poet of the 17th century.+

Memorial plaque
 Jan Tarło's cenotaph

See also
 List of mannerist structures in Central Poland
 List of Jesuit sites
 St. Jacek's Church in Warsaw
 Warsaw Old Town

References

Images

External links

 Church of Our Lady of Grace 
 Description and photos of the church
  Before the Second World War
  Matka Boża Łaskawa (Our Lady of Grace)
 sztuka.net Pictures of the church shortly after the war (the pile of rubble on the left of St. John's Cathedral).

Religious buildings and structures completed in 1626
Roman Catholic churches in Warsaw
17th-century Roman Catholic church buildings in Poland
Jesuit churches in Poland
Rebuilt buildings and structures in Poland
1626 establishments in the Polish–Lithuanian Commonwealth
Mannerist architecture in Poland
The Most Holy Virgin Mary, Queen of Poland